The State Journal is a weekly newspaper based in Charleston, West Virginia, and published by NCWV Media. It is the only newspaper with political and general news content distributed throughout the state of West Virginia.

The State Journal was founded as a business newspaper in 1984, containing business news and editorials on business subjects. In 2002, the newspaper was acquired by West Virginia Media Holdings, which greatly expanded the operating budget of the newspaper. It then began to also cover legal and government news and introduce conservative editorial content on subjects other than business.

West Virginia Media Holdings would later sell the paper to NCWV Media in December 2016.

References

External links
 The State Journal website

State Journal, The
Publications established in 1984
1984 establishments in West Virginia